Mariah Robertson (born 1975) is an American photographer. She lives in New York City.

Robertson has exhibited work internationally including at Saatchi Gallery in London and MoMA PS1 in Long Island City. In 2015 she was a co-founded Situations Gallery in the Lower East Side in New York City. where she hosted Temporal Situations, a month-long program of live and time-based events from 2016 to 2017. Her work appears on the cover of the 2016 Elton John album "Wonderful Crazy Night." She is represented by M+B Gallery in Los Angeles, and Van Doren Waxter in New York City.

Robertson was born in Indianapolis, Indiana and spent her childhood in Sacramento, California. She served as curator at Lair of the Minotaur gallery in San Francisco in the 2000s.

Education
Robertson received her BA in Religious Studies from UC Berkeley, and her MFA from Yale University.

Exhibitions and performances

2006: 
 Please lie down and take a nap with me in my grave, Guild & Greyshkul, New York City
2007: 
 Nudes, Still Lives and Landscapes, Guild & Greyshkul, New York City
2009: 
 Take Better Pictures, Museum 52, New York, NY
 Guild & Greyshkul, New York City Performance.
 I Am Passions, Marvelli Gallery, New York, NY 
2010: 
 'Performance, Art Basel Miami Beach, Miami, FL. Curated by Klaus Biesenbach.
 Solo Presentation, Berlin
 50 Artists Photograph the Future, Higher Pictures, New York, NY
2011: 
 MoMA PS1, Long Island City, NY. Performance.
 Baltic Centre for Contemporary Art, Gateshead, UK. Solo exhibition.
 Central Utah Art Center, Ephraim, UT. Performance.
 HOT TROPICAL RAIN JAM Museum 52, New York, NY. Solo Exhibition
2012: 
 Let's Change, Grand Arts, Kansas City, MO. Solo exhibition.
 Robert and Arlene Kogod Courtyard, National Portrait Gallery, Smithsonian Institution, Washington DC. Performance.
 The First Annual Artists’ Halloween Carnival and Parade, Museum of Modern Art, New York City Performance.
 New Art Dealers Alliance (NADA), New York City
2013:
 Permanent Puberty, American Contemporary, New York, NY. Solo Exhibition.
2014: 
 A World of Its Own: Photographic Practices in the Studio, Museum of Modern Art, New York, NY. Group Exhibition
 What is a Photograph?, International Center of Photography, New York, NY. Group Exhibition
 Modern Alchemy: Experiments in Photography, The Heckscher Museum of Art, Huntington, NY. Group Exhibition
 Paris Photo, Los Angeles, Los Angeles, CA  
2015: 
 Photography Lovers’ Peninsula,  M+B, Los Angeles, CA. Solo Exhibition 
2016:
 Two-person exhibition with Jennie Jieun Lee, Eleven Rivington, New York, NY. Solo Exhibition.
2017:
 Chaos Power Center, 11R, New York, NY. Solo Exhibition.
2018: 
 The Hydra, M+B, Los Angeles, CA. Solo Exhibition
 Fun Packed Holiday, Lora Reynolds, Austin, TX
2019:
 Mariah Robertson, Swope Art Museum, Terre Haute, IN. Solo Exhibition.
2020: 
 Summer Selection 2020, Galerie Miranda, Paris, FR. Group Exhibition.Repetition and Difference, Van Doren Waxter, New York City. Solo Exhibition.
2021:
 Repetition & Difference'', M+B, Los Angeles, CA. Solo Exhibition.

Residency 

 2011: Central Utah Art Center
 2016, MacDowell Colony

Collections

Robertson's work is held in the following permanent public collections:
 Los Angeles County Museum of Art, CA
 Museum of Modern Art, New York City
 North Carolina Museum of Art, Raleigh, NC: 1 item (as of June 2018)
 Whitney Museum of Art, New York, NY

References

Sources

External links

 Mariah Robertson’s Chemical Reactions | ART21 “New York Close Up”
 Mariah Robertson Wears a Yellow Suit to Work | "New York Close Up" | Art21
 West, Tanner, "On View: Mariah Robertson’s Prismatic Photograms Showcase Her Startling Darkroom Ingenuity—See Them Here", Artnet, January 19th, 2018
 “The Look Out”, Art in America, May 18, 2017
 Russeth, Andrew.“Mariah Robertson: Permanent Puberty at American Contemporary”The New York Observer.November 2013.
 Small, Rachel. “Mariah Robertson's Unplanning.”Interview. October 2013.
 Mariah Robertson reading Nomadology : The War Machine by Gilles Deleuze & Félix Guattari, Printed Matters
 Mariah Robertson’s Bold Photographic Installations Go on Display, Architectural Digest

1975 births
Living people
American women photographers
21st-century American women